Balan: Book of Angels Volume 5 is an album by the Cracow Klezmer Band performing compositions from John Zorn's second Masada book, The Book of Angels.

Reception
The Allmusic review by Thom Jurek awarded the album 4 stars, calling it an "entrancing, ingenious, and by all means exotic recording".

Track listing 
All compositions by John Zorn.
 "Zuriel" - 4:18
 "Suria" - 7:56
 "Lirael" - 6:07
 "Kadosh" - 2:43
 "Haniel" - 5:02
 "Jehoel" - 5:17
 "Asbeel" - 5:05
 "Aniel" - 3:48
Recorded at Studio 2002 in Kraków on February 13, February 19 and March 1, 2006

Personnel 
 Jaroslaw Bester – bayan
 Oleg Dyyak – percussion
 Wojciech Front – double bass
 Jaroslaw Tyrala – violin
 Jorgos Skolias – vocal
 Ireneusz Socha – computer instruments
 Special Guests - the DAFO string quartet
 Anna Armatys – cello
 Danuta Augustyn – violin
 Justyna Duda – violin
 Aneta Dumanowska – viola

References 

2006 albums
Albums produced by John Zorn
Book of Angels albums
Tzadik Records albums
The Cracow Klezmer Band albums